Nib sugar (also pearl sugar and hail sugar) is a product of refined white sugar. The sugar is very coarse, hard, opaque white, and does not melt at temperatures typically used for baking. The product usually is made by crushing blocks of white sugar, then sifting to obtain fragments of a given diameter. The sugar may also be made in an extrusion process.

It is known as pärlsocker (pearl sugar) in Sweden, and as perlesukker in Denmark and Norway. In Finland, it is called raesokeri ("hailstone sugar") or rarely helmisokeri (also pearl sugar).

In Sweden, pärlsocker is used extensively to decorate various pastries and confections, cookies, especially on top of plain Swedish bulle or Finnish pulla, cakes, muffins and buns, such as kanelbullar (cinnamon buns) and chokladbollar.

In Germany, it is known as Hagelzucker and traditionally used on Christmas cookies and cinnamon buns.

In Belgium, it is used in Liège waffles, while in Friesland, it is used in sûkerbôle (sugar bread).

In France, it is often used on chouquettes.

References

External links

Sugars
Danish cuisine
Finnish cuisine
Norwegian cuisine
Swedish cuisine
Dutch cuisine

de:Zucker#Form und Körnung